State Route 127 is a state highway in the state of Utah that spans  within Syracuse in Davis County.

Route description

The western terminus of the route is at the intersection of SR-110 (4500 West) and 1700 South (west of SR-127, 1700 South becomes the Davis County Causeway, a causeway over the Great Salt Lake that provides access to Antelope Island). The route continues east until it ends at SR-108 (2000 West), while 1700 South continues east along SR-108.

History
The part of 1700 South east of 2000 West in Syracuse was added to the state highway system in 1931 as SR-108, a designation it still carries. From 2000 West to 4500 West, the road became a state highway in 1935, but with a different number - SR-195 (which turned north on 4500 West to Hooper). The entire length of SR-195 was removed from the state highway system in 1947, but was re-added in the 1960s. A new State Route 127 was designated in 1965, following the 1700 South portion of former SR-195 and continuing west to the north end of Antelope Island via the Antelope Island Causeway; 4500 West was restored in 1969 as a new SR-110. The causeway was closed in June 1983 due to high water in the Great Salt Lake, and in 1991 the state legislature passed a law to fund a reconstruction through the Utah Division of Parks and Recreation. The Utah Transportation Commission gave the causeway to Davis County that year to make it possible for a toll to be charged, leaving SR-127 running only from SR-110 east to SR-108. The new causeway opened in July 1993, ten years after the old one had been closed.

Major intersections

References

127
 127
Streets in Utah